The 2022 Indonesia President's Cup was the fifth edition of Indonesia President's Cup, held by the Football Association of Indonesia (PSSI) as a pre-season tournament for the 2022–23 Liga 1. The tournament started on 11 June and finished on 17 July 2022. The tournament returned after being on hiatus for two years due to the COVID-19 pandemic that hit Indonesia.

Arema were the defending champions after winning the title in 2019, and they beat Borneo Samarinda 1–0 on aggregate in the finals for their third overall and second consecutive title.

Teams 
The following 18 teams (18 from Liga 1) participated for the tournament.

Notes

Venues
Manahan, Segiri, Gelora Bandung Lautan Api, Jalak Harupat, and Kanjuruhan were used for group stage match. Jalak Harupat was appointed due to an incident at Gelora Bandung Lautan Api. Jalak Harupat, Maguwoharjo, Segiri, Jatidiri, and Kanjuruhan were used for knockout stage as the team reached the stage.

Draw 
The draw of the tournament was held on 29 May 2022. The draw resulted in the following groups:

Format
In this tournament, 18 teams were drawn into four groups each consisting of five teams from groups A and B, four teams from groups C and D. Quarter-final matches were held once at each group winner's home stadium. Semi-final and final rounds were held home and away. Away goals rule was not applied. Extra time and penalty shootout were used to break the tie.

Group stage
The top two teams of each group advanced to the quarter-finals.

All times were local, WIB (UTC+7).

Group A

Group B

Group C

Group D

Knockout stage
In the quarter-finals, extra time would not be played, and a match would go straight to a penalty shoot-out to determine the winner. In the semi-finals and finals, the away goals rule would not be applied, and a match would go to extra time and, if necessary, a penalty shoot-out.

All times were local, WIB (UTC+7).

Bracket

Quarter-finals

Semi-finals

Arema won 4–1 on aggregate.

Borneo Samarinda won 6–0 on aggregate.

Finals

Arema won 1–0 on aggregate.

Statistics

Goalscorers

Awards
 Fair play team was awarded to Borneo Samarinda.
 Top scorer was awarded to Matheus Pato (Borneo Samarinda) with six goals.
 Best young player was awarded to Fajar Fathur (Borneo Samarinda).
 Best player was awarded to Adilson Maringá (Arema).

Tournament team rankings 
As per statistical convention in football, matches decided in extra time were counted as wins and losses, while matches decided by penalty shoot-outs were counted as draws.

Controversies

Gelora Bandung Lautan Api Stadium crowd incident

On the group C match between Persib Bandung (host) and Persebaya Surabaya, which took place on 17 June 2022 at Gelora Bandung Lautan Api Stadium, Bandung, an uncontrolled mass that was forced to enter the stage caused at least two people killed. The stadium arena was reported to be in poor condition with eight entrances vandalized, trash strewn and items abandoned. In response to the event, Football Association of Indonesia via their website, released that they will investigate the incident. Disciplinary committee of PSSI imposed Persib a fine of IDR 50 Million and a ban on playing at the Gelora Bandung Lautan Api Stadium for the remainder of the tournament.

Agung Prasetyo "kungfu kick"
Yudi Nurcahya was a FIFA licensed referee and led the second leg of the finals between Borneo Samarinda and Arema at Segiri Stadium, Samarinda. At the 33rd minute of the match, Arema player Gian Zola's head was struck by Borneo Samarinda player Agung Prasetyo's "kungfu kick" when Zola was about to head the ball in the air, potentially injuring Zola. Nurcahya gave no card to Prasetyo (despite such actions being punishable according to the FIFA Laws of the Game), instead giving it to Zola. Arema player Adam Alis was also given a yellow card by the referee relating to the call.

References 

2022 in Indonesian football
2022 in Indonesian sport
Association football controversies